Sydapuram or Saidapuram is a village and mandal located in Nellore district, Andhra Pradesh, India.

Geography
It has an average elevation of 23 meters (78 feet).
 Best mandal for minerals like MICA ,Quartz and Feldsper are available

References

Villages in Nellore district
Mining communities in India